The Pyxis of Zamora (made in 964 CE /353 aH) is an carved ivory casket (pyx) that dates from the Caliphate of Córdoba. It is now in the National Archaeological Museum of Spain in Madrid, Spain.

Background and Context 
This cylindrical carved box was commissioned by the Umayyad caliph Al-Hakam II in 964 CE for Subh, his concubine, and the mother of the princes Abd al-Rahman and Hishâm and is linked to the palatine ivory workshops of Madinat al-Zahra. It was intended to hold cosmetics, jewelry, or perfume containers. This portable piece represents the sophistication of the ruling class during the Caliphate of Cordoba. During this period, the Umayyads in Spain, or the al-Andalus, were both competing with the Abbasid society in Baghdad, and attempting to reclaim the power that they held from Damascus during the Umayyad period. In Cordoba, the Umayyads commissioned notable architectural developments and luxury goods, including textiles and ivory carvings, such as this pyxis, the Pyxis of Zamora. The iconography found within the carvings on the surfaces of many of the pyxides created during this period reinforced the ideas of the Umayyad political superiority over the Abbasids. This object, created in the flourishing intellectual city center of Cordoba during the peak of Hispano-Umayyad art demonstrates the refinement of the Cordoba Caliphate.

The birth of the heir apparent Prince Abd Al-Rahman was celebrated not only in poetry but also in visual art.  The Arabic inscription lining the lid of the Ivory Pyxis reads as follows: “The blessing of Allah upon the Imam, the servant of Allah, al-Hakam II al-Mustansir billah, Commander of the Faithful. This is what he ordered to be made for the noble lady, the mother of Abd al-Rahman under the direction of Durri as-Saghir in the year 353 [964 AD]”. He inherited the name Abd Al-Rahman from his grandfather Abd Al-Rahman III.

Methods and Techniques 
Ivory carving was a widespread practice in the Mediterranean world, beginning before the time of the Roman empire. Ivory was expensive due to the distance between sub-sahara Africa and India, where elephant tusk was procured, and the Mediterranean, where it was carved. The Umayyad Caliphate brought the pyxis carving tradition to Spain as they took control of the peninsula in the 8th century AD. There is no evidence of Ivory box or pyxides carvings in Spain before Umayyad rule.

The quality of the craft of pyxides was vital due to the expense of ivory. Among Islamic, Christian, and Roman carvings, a sign of good workmanship was a lack of tool marks. The carving of small objects such as pyxides took precision and time which also added to the overall price. The Pyxis of Zamora displays this quality of work through the deep-relief interlacing pattern and the lack of any visible tool marks. These carving techniques are seen in other pyxides created in the same period, such as the Pyxis of al-Mughira. The price and rarity of pyxides made them accessible only to the royal class.

Cylindrical pyxides, such as the Pyxis of Zamora, were created using the natural curvature and hollowness of the thickest part of the elephant tusk. Cylindrical pyxides were less prone to warping than rectangular boxes because of the preserved strength of the tusk in a circular shape. The unbroken surface of the Pyxis of Zamora allowed for unified compositional decoration without edges in the ivory. The interlacing effect of the decoration, in conjunction with the Arabic inscription on the lid (detailing the patronage and gifting of the pyxis), indicated that the receiver of the pyxis was meant to turn the object around in their hands to fully appreciate the craftsmanship. The decoration of the Pyxis of Zamora also encouraged the viewer to open the container since the expensive exterior mirrored the precious material held inside (often perfume or jewels).

Symbolism and Interpretations

The Winged Motif 
The Pyxis of Zamora features many depictions of spread wings within its arabesque decoration. The winged motif gained popularity during its use in Sasanian culture. Extended wings symbolized power and religion, as the motif was often seen on the crowns of Sasanian kings as well as on Sasanian seals. This Sasanian trend later influenced the royal decorative arts of the Umayyad period, resulting in the repeated use of the winged motif on luxury goods.

The Peacock 

The image of the peacock is repeated four times in the central section of the Pyxis of Zamora. In the context of medieval Islam, peacocks were viewed as having apotropaic powers. This view was the result of varying Islamic beliefs of the bird. Some Islamic interpreters believed the peacock mated asexually, thus associating the bird with purity. There were other interpretations from Arabic naturalists, who believed peacocks could detect poison. This led to the common medicinal use of peacock feathers. Popular legends told of the bird's ability to kill snakes, religiously alluding to the peacock's ability to avert the evil influences of the devil. This gave the bird a connection to the Islamic conception of Paradise. The peacock continued to be an important image in the Islamic world, as feathers or images of peacocks were often used in a royal context in imitation of Persian traditions.

The Gazelle 
Several images of the gazelle surround the peacocks depicted on the Pyxis of Zamora. This history of the meaning of the gazelle began in pre-Islamic Arabic poetry, in which the gazelle was often depicted as having magical qualities. The slender bodies and wide eyes of gazelles alluded them to women. Later Umayyads continued to associate gazelles with femininity and elegance. They were viewed as seductive and swift prey and were often celebrated by hunters.

See also
Pyxis of al-Mughira
Leyre Casket

References

Arabic art
Ivory works of art
Islamic art of Spain
10th-century sculptures
964
10th century in Al-Andalus
Collection of the National Archaeological Museum, Madrid